Trifolium pratense, the red clover, is a herbaceous species of flowering plant in the bean family Fabaceae, native to Europe, Western Asia, and northwest Africa, but planted and naturalized in many other regions.

Description

It has a deep taproot which makes it tolerant to drought and gives it a good soil structuring effect.

Distribution
The red clover is native to Europe, Western Asia, and northwest Africa, but it has been naturalized in other continents, like North and South America. Specifically, the red clover was brought to Argentina and Chile over 100 years ago, although it is not clear how exactly it was introduced. The red clover has become increasingly important as a source of economic stability in Chile, which has made the need for pollinators even more important. One important pollinator, which was also brought from Europe, is Bombus ruderatus, or the large garden bumblebee. This bumblebee has been one of the important pollinators of red clover in South America and other countries such as New Zealand. In India the highest producer of Red Clover seed is the Agriculture Department of Kashmir’s Fodder Seed Production Station Aru, in south Kashmir’s Anantnag district of Jammu & Kashmir. Two red clover accessions were deposited in National Gene Bank of India from Fodder Seed Production Station Aru in 2019 vide IC-635999 and IC-636000 by ICAR.

Uses

It is widely grown as a fodder crop, valued for its nitrogen fixation, which increases soil fertility. For these reasons, it is used as a green manure crop. Several cultivar groups have been selected for agricultural use, mostly derived from T. pratense var. sativum. It has become naturalised in many temperate areas, including the Americas and Australasia as an escape from cultivation.

Due to its beauty, it is used as an ornamental plant.

Red clover's flowers and leaves are edible, and can be added as garnishes to any dish. They can be ground into a flour.

The flowers often are used to make jelly and tisanes, and are used in essiac recipes. Their essential oil may be extracted and its unique scent used in aromatherapy.

Trifolium pratense's perennial nature affords sustained, reliable growth. Furthermore, the species' ability to fix nitrogen promotes protein rich growth, enables it to support a wide range of wildlife including deer, turkeys, and rabbits. These characteristics make Trifolium pratense useful for hunters interested in attracting game. The pink flowers afford high visibility levels and facilitate such attraction and may be used by wildlife remediation teams and conservationists seeking to build wildlife bridges to connect fragmented habitats.

Alternative and traditional medicine
In the traditional medicine of India, Trifolium pratense is believed to be a deobstruent, antispasmodic, expectorant, sedative, anti-inflammatory and antidermatosis agent.

In alternative medicine, red clover is promoted as a treatment for a variety of human maladies, including symptoms of menopause, coughs, disorders of the lymphatic system and a variety of cancers. There is some evidence it may reduce the frequency of hot flushes in menopausal women. There is no good evidence it is of any benefit in preventing or treating cancer of any other disease.

Due to its coumarin derivatives, T. pratense should be used with caution in individuals with coagulation disorders or currently undergoing anticoagulation therapy. It is metabolised by CYP3A4 and therefore caution should be used when taking it with other drugs using this metabolic pathway.

Diseases

Red clover is subject to bacterial as well as fungal diseases, including the red clover rust, Uromyces trifolii-repentis var. fallens. Other problems include parasitic nematodes (roundworms) and viruses.

Symbolism
Trifolium pratense is the national flower of Denmark and the state flower of Vermont.

See also
Green manure
List of ineffective cancer treatments

References

Further reading

External links

 Red-clover seed production in the Intermountain States hosted by the UNT Government Documents Department
Flora Europaea: Trifolium pratense

pratense
Flora of Europe
Flora of Western Asia
Flora of North Africa
Flora of Estonia
Flora of Norway
Flora of the United Kingdom
Symbols of Vermont
Vermont culture
Garden plants of Europe
Butterfly food plants
Plants described in 1753
Nitrogen-fixing crops
Taxa named by Carl Linnaeus
ka:ტყის სამყურა